eBikeGo is an Indian moto-scooter rental company. 

eBikeGo's Rugged is an electric moto-scooter equipped with two 2.3 kWh swappable batteries that power an electric motor to produce 4 bhp of peak power. This allows the scooter to attain a top speed of 75 km/h and offers a riding range of up to 160 km per charge. eBikeGo aimed at providing environment-friendly mode of transportation. eBikeGo is currently present across seven cities in India and is providing last-mile delivery options in Mumbai, Pune, Delhi, Bangalore, Hyderabad, Indore and Amritsar.

History

eBikeGo was founded by Irfan Khan in 2019 as an electric bike rental company with 160 bikes. It has an electric mode of transportation that runs for around 100 km after a 3-hour charge with speeds of around 55 kph. eBikeGo has EV chargers in Mumbai. It also has an online platform that provides e-bikes for rent. The company has a fleet of around 3,500 electric scooters.

eBikeGo launched Rugged electric bike in August 2021 for commuting within the city and rural areas. eBikeGo is currently present across seven cities in India and is providing last-mile delivery options in Mumbai, Pune, Delhi, Bangalore, Hyderabad, Indore and Amritsar.

In November 2021, eBikeGo acquired manufacturing rights of Velocipedo and Muvi which would be produced locally in Pune, India.

References

External links
 Official website

2019 establishments in Maharashtra
Online companies of India
Indian companies established in 2019
Companies based in Mumbai
